Cyperus microglumis is a species of sedge that is native to eastern parts of Africa.

See also 
 List of Cyperus species

References 

microglumis
Plants described in 1990
Flora of Somalia
Flora of Ethiopia